The Fall Guy is an American action/adventure television series produced for ABC and originally broadcast from November 4, 1981, to May 2, 1986. It starred Lee Majors, Douglas Barr, and Heather Thomas as Hollywood stunt performers who moonlight as bounty hunters.

Plot
Lee Majors plays Colt Seavers, a Hollywood stunt man who moonlights as a bounty hunter. He uses his physical skills and knowledge of stunt effects (especially stunts involving cars or his large GMC pickup truck) to capture fugitives and criminals. He is accompanied by his cousin and stuntman-in-training Howie Munson (Barr), who studied in Nashville—whom Colt frequently calls "Kid", and occasionally by fellow stuntwoman  Jody Banks (Thomas).

Cast
 Lee Majors as Colt Seavers 
 Douglas Barr as Howie "Kid" Munson
 Heather Thomas as Jody Banks
 Jo Ann Pflug as Samantha "Big Jack" Jack (1981–82)
 Markie Post as Terri Shannon / Michaels (1982–1985)

Episodes

Adaptations and spin-offs  

A board game adaptation based on the show was released by the Milton Bradley Company in 1981.

A comic strip adaptation was drawn by Jim Baikie for Look-In magazine.

A video game adaptation was produced by British video game developer Elite Systems in 1984.

A comedy advertising campaign ran in 1990 using various scenes and music to advertise a small town in Derbyshire (Codnor) selling a spring water soft drink called Codnor Falls.

Home media
On June 5, 2007, 20th Century Fox released the first season of The Fall Guy on DVD in Region 1. As with a number of other TV shows of the era released on DVD, the six-disc set contains extensive music substitutions due to copyright reasons (as well as completely editing out the sequences with actor/singer Paul Williams, in the pilot). Due to poor sales, whether the remaining seasons will be released is unknown.

Season one was released on DVD in Region 2 in Germany and the UK. Season two has also been released in Region 2, in Germany on November 28, 2008 and in the UK on February 16, 2009.

Nielsen ratings
The highest rating is in bold text.

Intros
The series introductions were composed mainly by both scenes from the TV series and from risk scenes taken from films that dated before 1981.

In season one, the montage of scenes was borrowed from the films Dirty Mary, Crazy Larry, The Stunt Man, Silver Streak, Butch Cassidy and the Sundance Kid, The Hot Rock, Our Man Flint, The Poseidon Adventure, Speedway, and Sky Riders. Exclusively for the season-one opening narration, Singin' in the Rain, The Blue Max, Race with the Devil, and Moving Violation were used. Also included are archival footages from stunt shows made in the 1930s.

Following season two, a few of the borrowed movie risk scenes were replaced by stunt scenes from the TV series.

The truck
Seavers's truck was a Rounded-Line 1981 GMC K-2500 Wideside with the Sierra Grande equipment package. A Rounded-Line 1980 GMC K-25 Wideside with the High Sierra equipment package was also used. During the show's initial series, the stunts took their toll on the modified production trucks, supplied at low cost to the production by General Motors, so several different years, makes (Chevy/GMC), and models were used during the show's initial run. As a result, some inconsistencies appear in the episodes.

From the second season onwards, General Motors supplied three specially adapted trucks for the stunt sequences, with the engine moved to a midchassis position immediately under the cab seat. This meant that these trucks flew further and pitched less in the air, allowing them to be reused for multiple takes and shows.

At the end of the series, the remaining trucks were either auctioned or given away in a contest. One of them was sold on eBay in 2003.

Film remake

In July 2010, the Los Angeles Times reported that a film based on the series was in development. DreamWorks had teamed up with producers Walter F. Parkes and Laurie MacDonald on the project, and Martin Campbell was in talks to direct the film. DreamWorks, through Disney's Touchstone Pictures distribution label, was to release the film in North America, Latin America, Russia, Australia, and Asia, while Mister Smith Entertainment would have handled sales in the remaining territories. In September 2013, Dwayne Johnson was in negotiations to play the title role and McG was in talks to direct.

As of 2020, however, that planned movie was never made, and a different film more loosely based on the television series was being planned by Universal Pictures, with Ryan Gosling in the starring role and David Leitch in the director's chair. In August 2022, Emily Blunt was cast. The film is set to be released on March 1, 2024.

See also
 1981 in American television

References

External links

 
 

1981 American television series debuts
1986 American television series endings
American action adventure television series
American action comedy television series
American Broadcasting Company original programming
English-language television shows
Fictional bounty hunters
Fictional stunt performers
Television series by 20th Century Fox Television
Television series created by Glen A. Larson
Television shows adapted into comics
Television shows adapted into films
Television shows set in Los Angeles